Yuluk (Yulıq) is a rural locality (a village) in Baymaksky District, Bashkortostan, Russia. The population was 470 as of 2010. There are 9 streets.

Geography 
Yuluk is located 46 km west of Baymak (the district's administrative centre) by road. Yumashevo is the nearest rural locality.

References 

Rural localities in Baymaksky District